Franklin Corners is an unincorporated community located along the Passaic River at the intersection of County Route 613 (Childs Road) and U.S. Route 202 (Morristown Road) in Bernards Township of Somerset County, New Jersey. In the 19th century, it had a grist mill, saw mill, general store, school, and several houses. The Franklin Corners Historic District, featuring Van Dorn's Mill, was listed on the National Register of Historic Places in 1975.

History
In 1768, Samuel Lewis built a wooden grain mill here on the Passaic River. During the American Revolutionary War, it provided grain to the Continental Army during the 1779–1780 winter encampment at nearby Jockey Hollow. In 1842, Ferdinand Van Dorn bought the property and built a new, three and one-half story stone mill, now known as Van Dorn's Mill. In 1929, local resident and prominent restaurateur William Childs bought the mill property and moved the barn to the other side of U.S. 202. He restored it and established an inn, now known as the Grain House Restaurant at the Olde Mill Inn. In the 1970s, the Olde Mill Inn hotel, venue and meeting center was built on the property next to the restaurant.

The Franklin Academy was a small private school for the community. The two story schoolhouse on Childs Road was built in 1832 with Greek Revival style.

Historic district

The Franklin Corners Historic District is a  historic district encompassing the community along Hardscrabble and Childs roads in Bernards Township. It was added to the National Register of Historic Places on May 12, 1975 for its significance in architecture, commerce, education and industry. The district includes 11 contributing buildings.

In 1935, Van Dorn's Mill, then owned by William Childs, was documented by the Historic American Buildings Survey. McMurtry's Saw Mill, built in 1850, was documented by HABS in 1939.

The Ferdinand Van Dorn House, next to the mill, is a two and one-half story house built with Greek Revival style. The oldest house in the district, the Samuel Johnson House, was built . The oldest section of the Joab Johnson House was built . It was later William Gordon's General Store .

Transportation

There are several main roads in the community. U.S. Route 202, running south from Morristown and northeast from Bernardsville, intersects with County Route 613 (Childs Road) and North Maple Avenue, running north from Basking Ridge.

Childs Road is named after William Childs and his brother Samuel. Van Dorn Road is named after Ferdinand Van Dorn.

See also
 National Register of Historic Places listings in Somerset County, New Jersey
 New Jersey Brigade Encampment Site – Additional 1779–1780 winter encampment site
 List of the oldest buildings in New Jersey

References

External links
 
 
 
  On Van Dorn Mill.

Bernards Township, New Jersey
Unincorporated communities in Somerset County, New Jersey
Unincorporated communities in New Jersey
Historic American Buildings Survey in New Jersey